Arta brevivalvalis is a species of moth of the  family Pyralidae that is endemic to Arizona.

The forewings are reddish brown to purplish brown with ochreous antemedial and postmedial lines. The hindwings are greyish brown.

References

Chrysauginae
Endemic fauna of Arizona
Moths of North America
Moths described in 2012